Yvonne Johnson was the mayor of Greensboro, North Carolina, from 2007 until 2009. She was previously a member of the Greensboro City Council for 14 years, beginning in 1993 and Mayor Pro-Tem for 6 years. Johnson was the first African-American to serve as Greensboro's mayor.

Johnson lost her reelection bid in 2009 to Republican political newcomer Bill Knight. In 2011, she ran for election again, this time for an at-large city council seat, having garnered the most votes of any candidate in the October, 2011 city primary. In the November, 2011 election, Johnson won the majority of the at-large vote, reclaiming her city council position of Mayor Pro-Tem.

She is married to Walter Johnson, who is an attorney; they have four children. In February 2010 the Greensboro Economic Development Alliance (GEDA) awarded her with the Stanley Frank Lifetime Achievement Award. She is the executive director of One Step Further, a non-profit United Way Agency in Greensboro that provides mediation and court alternative programs to Greensboro's youth. Johnson serves on the board of directors for Malachi House and was the Women's Resource Center's first president. She has also served on boards for Greensboro Housing Coalition, Foster Friends, Sports Dreams and the Greensboro Arts Council.

References

External links 
 Greensboro Mayor official government website
 Yvonne Johnson campaign website
 North Carolina Public Radio interview December 10, 2007
 greensboroeda.com 2/2010
 10/21/07, article "Steel Magnolias"
 yesweekly.com 11-1-09

Women mayors of places in North Carolina
African-American mayors in North Carolina
Greensboro, North Carolina City Council members
Living people
North Carolina Democrats
21st-century American politicians
21st-century American women politicians
Year of birth missing (living people)
Mayors of Greensboro, North Carolina
African-American city council members in North Carolina
21st-century African-American women
21st-century African-American politicians
African-American women mayors